This is a list of seasons completed by the Fresno State Bulldogs football program since the team's conception in 1921. The list documents season-by-season records.

Seasons

Notes

References

Fresno State

Fresno State Bulldogs football seasons